Callistege fortalitium is a species of moth of the family Erebidae. It is found in southern Russia (Ural, Altai, Tuva, Siberia), Kazakhstan, Dagestan, Armenia, China and Mongolia.

References

Moths described in 1865
Callistege